Each "article" in this category is a collection of entries about several stamp issuers, presented in alphabetical order. The entries are formulated on the micro model and so provide summary information about all known issuers.

See the :Category:Compendium of postage stamp issuers page for details of the project.

Britain 

Refer 	Great Britain

British Administration Issues 

Refer 	Eritrea (British Administration);
		Somalia (British Administration);
		Tripolitania (British Military Administration)

British Antarctic Territory 

Dates 	1963 –
Currency 	(1963) 12 pence = 1 shilling, 20 shillings = 1 pound
		(1971) 100 pence = 1 pound

See also 	Falkland Islands Dependencies;
		South Georgia & South Sandwich Islands

British Bechuanaland 

Territory in southern Africa which was separated from Bechuanaland Protectorate (now Botswana)
by the Molopo river.  British Bechuanaland became a British colony on 30 September 1885 but was added to Cape Colony on 16 November 1895.  It is now the northern part of Cape Province in
South Africa.

The first stamps issued were Cape of Good Hope types with an overprint.  Specific types were
issued in 1887 but subsequently there were further British and Cape types with overprints.
Cape of Good Hope stamps were introduced to British Bechuanaland in 1895 but, conversely,
British Bechuanaland types were retained for use in the neighbouring Bechuanaland Protectorate
from 1890 to 1897.

Dates 	1885 – 1897
Capital 	Mafeking
Currency 	12 pence = 1 shilling, 20 shillings = 1 pound

Refer 	Cape of Good Hope

See also 	Bechuanaland Protectorate

British Central Africa 

Dates 	1891 – 1908
Capital 	Zomba
Currency 	12 pence = 1 shilling; 20 shillings = 1 pound

Main article  Postage stamps and postal history of British Central Africa

See also 	Malawi;
		Nyasaland Protectorate

British Columbia 
Dates 
1865 – 1868
Capital 
Vancouver
Currency 
(1865) 12 pence = 1 shilling; 20 shillings = 1 pound
(1868) 100 cents = 1 dollar
Main Article
Postage stamps and postal history of British Columbia
Includes 
British Columbia and Vancouver Island
Vancouver Island
See also 
Canadian Provinces

British Columbia & Vancouver Island 
Dates 
1860 only
Capital 
Vancouver
Currency 
12 pence = 1 shilling; 20 shillings = 1 pound
Refer
British Columbia

British Commonwealth Occupation of Japan 
Refer 
Japan (British Commonwealth Occupation)

British Consular Mail 

Refer 	Madagascar (British Consular Mail)

British East Africa 

Dates 	1895 – 1903
Capital 	Nairobi
Currency 	16 annas = 1 rupee

Includes 	British East Africa Company;
		East Africa & Uganda Protectorates;
		Uganda Protectorate

See also 	Kenya Uganda & Tanzania (Combined Issues)

British East Africa Company 

Dates 	1890 – 1895
Currency 	16 annas = 1 rupee

Refer 	British East Africa

British Field Office in Salonika 

Refer 	Salonika (British Field Office)

British Forces in Egypt 

Refer 	Egypt (British Forces)

British Guiana 

Dates 	1850 – 1966
Capital 	Georgetown
Currency 	100 cents = 1 dollar

See also 	Guyana

British Honduras 

Dates 	1866 – 1973
Capital 	Belize
Currency 	(1866) 12 pence = 1 shilling; 20 shillings = 1 pound
		(1888) 100 cents = 1 dollar

Main Article Needed

See also 	Belize

British Indian Ocean Territory 

Dates 	1868 – 1976
Capital 	Victoria (on Mahe, Seychelles)
Currency 	100 cents = 1 rupee

Main Article Postage stamps and postal history of British Indian Ocean Territory

See also 	Seychelles;
		Zil Elwannyen Sesel

British Levant 

Refer 	British Post Offices in the Turkish Empire

British Middle East Forces 

Refer 	Middle East Forces

British Military Administration Issues (BMA) 

Refer 	Eritrea (British Military Administration);
		Malaya (British Military Administration);
		North Borneo (British Military Administration);
		Sarawak (British Military Administration);
		Somalia (British Military Administration);
		Tripolitania (British Military Administration)

British New Guinea 

Dates 	1901 – 1906
Capital 	Port Moresby
Currency 	12 pence = 1 shilling; 20 shillings = 1 pound

Refer 	Papua New Guinea

British Occupation Issues 

Main Article Needed

Includes 	Baghdad (British Occupation);
		Batum (British Occupation);
		Bushire (British Occupation);
		Cameroons (British Occupation);
		East Africa Forces;
		German East Africa (British Occupation);
		Iraq (British Occupation);
		Japan (British Commonwealth Occupation);
		Long Island (British Occupation);
		Mafia Island (British Occupation)

See also 	BA/BMA Issues;
		Egypt (British Forces);
		Germany (Allied Occupation);
		Middle East Forces;
		Togo (Anglo–French Occupation)

British Occupation of Italian Colonies 

Refer 	BA/BMA Issues;
		East Africa Forces;
		Middle East Forces

British Postal Agencies in Eastern Arabia 

British stamps overprinted with Indian currency; used in Abu Dhabi, Bahrain, Dubai, Kuwait, Muscat and Qatar.

Muscat and Dubai relied on Indian postal administration until 1 April 1948 when the British agencies were established.  Two agencies were opened in Qatar: at Doha (August 1950) and Umm Said (February 1956).  In Abu Dhabi, an agency was opened on Das Island in December 1960 and in Abu Dhabi City on 30 March 1963.  The agencies also supplied stamps to Bahrain until 1960; and to Kuwait during shortages in 1951–1953.

The agency in Dubai issued the Trucial States stamps on 7 January 1961.

As each state took over its own postal administration, the offices closed.  Closure dates were: Qatar on 31 March 1957; Dubai on 14 June 1963; Abu Dhabi on 29 March 1964; finally Muscat on 29 April 1966.

Dates 	1948 – 1966
Currency 	(1948) 12 pies = 1 anna; 16 annas = 1 rupee
		(1957) 100 naye paise = 1 rupee

Main Article Needed

See also 	Abu Dhabi;
		Bahrain;
		Dubai;
		Kuwait;
		Muscat;
		Qatar;
		Trucial States

British Post Offices Abroad 

Main Article Needed

Includes 	Bangkok (British Post Office);
		China (British Post Offices);
		China (British Railway Administration);
		Crete (British Post Offices);
		Japan (British Post Offices);
		Madagascar (British Consular Mail)

See also 	British Post Offices in the Turkish Empire;
		Morocco Agencies;
		Tangier

British Post Offices in the Turkish Empire 

Dates 	1885 – 1923
Currency 	40 paras = 1 piastre

Main Article Needed

Includes 	Beirut (British Post Office);
		Salonika (British Field Office)

British Regional Issues 

Refer 	Great Britain (Regional Issues)

British Solomon Islands 

Dates 	1907 – 1975
Capital 	Honiara
Currency 	12 pence = 1 shilling; 20 shillings = 1 pound

Refer 	Solomon Islands

British Somaliland 

Dates 	1903 only
Capital 	Berbera
Currency 	16 annas = 1 rupee

Refer 	Somaliland Protectorate

British South Africa Company 

In 1924, the territory was divided into Northern and Southern Rhodesia.

Dates 	1890 – 1924
Currency 	12 pence = 1 shilling; 20 shillings = 1 pound

Main Article Needed

See also 	Rhodesia

British Virgin Islands 

Dates 	1968 –
Capital 	Road Town
Currency 	100 cents = 1 dollar

Main Article
Postage stamps and postal history of the British Virgin Islands

Includes 	Virgin Islands

See also 	Leeward Islands

British Zone 

No separate issues.  From 1945 to 1949, always used the same stamps as the American Zone.

Refer 	American, British & Russian Zones (General Issues);
		Anglo–American Zones (Civil Government);
		Anglo–American Zones (Military Government)

References

Bibliography
 Stanley Gibbons Ltd, Europe and Colonies 1970, Stanley Gibbons Ltd, 1969
 Stanley Gibbons Ltd, various catalogues
 Stuart Rossiter & John Flower, The Stamp Atlas, W H Smith, 1989
 XLCR Stamp Finder and Collector's Dictionary, Thomas Cliffe Ltd, c.1960

External links
 AskPhil – Glossary of Stamp Collecting Terms
 Encyclopaedia of Postal History

Britain